This is a list of the National Register of Historic Places listings in Big Cypress National Preserve.

This is intended to be a complete list of the properties and districts on the National Register of Historic Places in Big Cypress National Preserve, Florida, United States.  The locations of National Register properties and districts for which the latitude and longitude coordinates are included below, may be seen in a Google map.

There are nine properties and districts listed on the National Register in the park.

Current listings 

|}

Former listings

|}

See also 
 National Register of Historic Places listings in Collier County, Florida
 National Register of Historic Places listings in Florida

References 

Big Cypress National Preserve